The 2023 Alabama Crimson Tide football team (variously "Alabama", "Bama", or "The Tide") will represent the University of Alabama in the 2023 NCAA Division I FBS football season. The season will mark the Crimson Tide's 129th overall season, 91st as a member of the Southeastern Conference (SEC), and 32nd within the SEC Western Division. They will play their home games at Bryant–Denny Stadium in Tuscaloosa, Alabama, and will be led by 17th-year head coach Nick Saban.

Previous season

Offseason

Team departures
Over the course of the off-season, Alabama lost 45 total players. 15 players graduated, 12 declared for the 2023 NFL Draft, while the other 18 entered the transfer portal.

Transfer portal

Outgoing transfers
19 Alabama players elected to enter the NCAA Transfer Portal during or after the 2022 season.

Note: Players with a dash in the new school column didn’t land on a new team for the 2023 season.

Incoming transfers
Over the off-season, Alabama added three players from the transfer portal. According to 247 Sports, Alabama had the No. 60 ranked transfer class in the country.

Returning starters

Offense

Defense

Special teams

 
† Indicates player was a starter in 2022 but missed all of 2023 due to injury.

Recruiting class

Alabama signed 29 players in the class of 2023. The Crimson Tide' recruiting class ranks No. 1 in the 247Sports and Rivals rankings. 23 signees were ranked in the ESPN 300 top prospect list. Alabama also signed walk-ons during national signing period.

 

 
 
 
 
 
 
 

 
 
  
  
  

 

  
 
 

2023 Overall class rankings

2024 recruiting class
 
 
 
 
 
 

2024 Overall class rankings

NFL draft
 
13 Crimson Tide players have declared for the 2023 NFL Draft thus far.

Walk-ons

Preseason

Spring game

The Crimson Tide are scheduled to hold spring practices in March and April 2023 with the Alabama football spring game, "A-Day" to take place in Tuscaloosa, AL on April 2023.

Award watch lists
Listed in the order that they were released

SEC media days
The 2023 SEC Media days were held on July 2023 at TBD. The Preseason Polls were released July 2023. Each team had their head coach available to talk to the media at the event. Coverage of the event was televised on SEC Network and ESPN.

Preseason All-SEC teams and All-American honors

Media
First Team

Second Team

Third Team

Source:

Coaches
First Team

Second Team

Third Team

Source:

Personnel

Roster

Coaching staff
Alabama head coach Nick Saban entered his seventeenth year as the Crimson Tide's head coach for the 2023 season. During his previous seventeen years with Alabama, he led the Crimson Tide to an overall record of 188 wins and 27 losses and the 2009, 2011, 2012, 2015, 2017 and 2020 national championships.

Support staff
 JT Summerford - Director of Football Operations
 Brandy Lyerly - Associate Director of Football Operations
 Ashleigh Kimble - Associate Director of Recruiting Operations
 Ellis Ponder - Associate Athletic Director & Football Chief Operating Officer
 Sam Petitto - Director of Personnel Operations 
 Bob Welton - Director of Player Personnel 
 Roger Bedford - Assistant Director of Player Personnel 
 Harding Harper - Assistant Director of Player Personnel
 Joe Pendry - Special Assistant to Head Coach 
 Todd Watson - Special Assistant to Head Coach 
 Ken Whisenhunt - Special Assistant to Head Coach
 TBD - Senior Special Assistant to Head Coach  
 Denzel Devall - Player Personnel/Player Development Assistant
 Josh Chapman - Director of Player Development
 HaHa Clinton-Dix - Director of Player Development
 Evan Van Nostrand - Assistant Director of Player Development, Character and Career Development
 Daniel Bush - Director of Football Recruitment
 Makenzie Votteler - Associate Director, Football Recruitment
 Carrigan Johnson - Football Operations Coordinator 
 Cedric Burns - Athletics Relations Coordinator  
 Savannah French - Football Marketing Coordinator   
 Kyle Smith - Director of Football Equipment 
 Jeff Springer - Assistant Athletic Director of Equipment Operations 
 Tim Roberts - Intern Equipment Manager  
 Linda Leoni - Administrative Assistant  
 Glenda Edwards - Administrative Secretary   
 Daniel Lyerly - Assistant Athletic Director of Football Video Operations 
 Kaleb Medema - Assistant Director of Football Video Operations
 Cass McCord - Assistant Director of Football Video Operations
 Jessica Beckenstein - Head Coach's Office Coordinator 
 Paul Constantine - Director of Sports Applied Science 
 Rick Danison - Assistant Strength and Conditioning Coach
 UJ Johnson - Assistant Strength and Conditioning Coach 
 Jessica Pare - Deputy Athletic Director, External
 Josh Maxson - Assistant Athletic Director of communications

Graduate Assistants
 TBD – Graduate Assistant
 Brenten Wimberly – Graduate Assistant
 TBD – Graduate Assistant
 Braxton Barker – Graduate Assistant
 Jamey Mosley - Graduate Assistant
 TBD - Graduate Assistant

Analysts
Dean Altobelli – Defensive Analyst
Bert Biffani – Defensive Backs Analyst
Ryan Finck – Offensive Analyst
 Max Bullough – Defensive Analyst
Nick Cochran – Offensive Analyst
George Banko – Football Analyst
 TBD - Offensive Analyst
 Zach Mettenberger - Football Analyst
 Derek Dooley – Offensive Analyst
 Jake Long – Defensive Analyst
 Nick McGriff - Special Teams Analyst

Depth chart

True Freshman

Injury report

Schedule
Alabama and the SEC announced the 2023 football schedule on September 20, 2022. The 2023 Crimson Tide' schedule consists of 7 home games and 5 away games for the regular season. Alabama will host four SEC conference opponents Arkansas, Ole Miss (rivalry), Tennessee (Third Saturday in October) and arch-rival LSU (rivalry) at home and will travel to four SEC opponents, Kentucky, Mississippi State (rivalry), Texas A&M and in-state-rival Auburn for the 87th annual (Iron Bowl) to close out the SEC regular season on the road. Alabama is not scheduled to play SEC East opponents Florida (rivalry), Georgia (rivalry),Missouri, South Carolina and Vanderbilt in the 2023 regular season. The Crimson Tide's bye week comes during week 9 (on October 28, 2023).

Alabama's out of conference opponents represent the Conference USA, Big 12, American and SoCon conferences. The Crimson Tide will host three non–conference games which are against Middle Tennessee from the C-USA, Texas from the Big 12 and to close out the regular season with Chattanooga from the SoCon (FCS) and will travel against South Florida from the American.

Game summaries

Middle Tennessee

Sources:

Texas

Sources:

at South Florida

Sources:

Ole Miss

Sources:

at Mississippi State

Sources:

at Texas A&M

Sources:

Arkansas

Sources:

Tennessee

Sources:

LSU

Sources:

at Kentucky

Sources:

Chattanooga

Sources:

at Auburn

Sources:

Rankings

Statistics

Team

Individual leaders

Defense

Key: POS: Position, SOLO: Solo Tackles, AST: Assisted Tackles, TOT: Total Tackles, TFL: Tackles-for-loss, SACK: Quarterback Sacks, INT: Interceptions, BU: Passes Broken Up, PD: Passes Defended, QBH: Quarterback Hits, FR: Fumbles Recovered, FF: Forced Fumbles, BLK: Kicks or Punts Blocked, SAF: Safeties, TD : Touchdown

Special teams

Scoring
Alabama vs Non-Conference Opponents

Alabama vs SEC Opponents

Alabama vs All Opponents

Awards and SEC honors

Postseason

Media affiliates

Radio
 WTID (FM) (Tide 102.9) – Nationwide (ESPN Radio, Dish Network, Sirius XM, Varsity Network and iHeartRadio)

TV
CBS Family – CBS 42 (CBS), CBS Sports Network 
ESPN/ABC Family – ABC 33/40 (ABC), ABC, ESPN, ESPN2, ESPNU, ESPN+, SEC Network
FOX Family – WBRC (FOX), FOX/FS1, FSN
NBC – WVTM-TV (NBC), NBC Sports
WVUA-CD (campus tv station)

TV ratings

All totals via Sports Media Watch. Streaming numbers not included. † - Data not available.

References

Alabama
Alabama Crimson Tide football seasons
Alabama Crimson Tide football